Alcidodes erosus, is a species of weevil found in Sri Lanka.

Description
Typical body length is about 9 to 11.5 mm. The inner longitudinal stripes gradually transition from the 2nd to the 3rd space, farthest apart at the apex.

References 

Curculionidae
Insects of Sri Lanka
Beetles described in 1960